Cueva de los Pincheira is a shallow cave located about  southeast of Chillán, in Ñuble Region, Central Chile. The cave is famous for being a hideout of the Pincheira brothers, a royalist outlaw gang. During high season there are reenactments in the cave.

The cave lies in the foothills of the Andes near . In the 1820s the cave was one of the Pincheira brothers main encampments together with other locations also close to Chillán. Up to a thousand people are reported to have gathered at the site during the heydays of the Pincheira brothers.

Local lore says that a white mule appears during the night in the small waterfall of the cave. Allegedly, this mule shows the route to the hidden treasures of the Pincheira brothers. It is also said that just before morning a cart can be heard near the cave; additionally, there are sayings that the cries of women have been heard together with the cart. The sayings explain that these are the cries of the women kept captive by the outlaws.

References

Pincheira
Landforms of Ñuble Region
Chilean legends
Caves used for hiding
Rock shelters
Tourist attractions in Ñuble Region